The Khartoum massacre occurred on 3 June 2019, when the armed forces of the Sudanese Transitional Military Council, headed by the Rapid Support Forces (RSF), the immediate successor organisation to the Janjaweed militia, used heavy gunfire and teargas to disperse a sit-in by protestors in Khartoum, killing more than 100 people, with difficulties in estimating the actual numbers. At least forty of the bodies had been thrown in the River Nile. Hundreds of unarmed civilians were injured, hundreds of unarmed citizens were arrested, many families were terrorised in their home estates across Sudan, and the RSF raped more than 70 women and men. The Internet was almost completely blocked in Sudan in the days following the massacre, making it difficult to estimate the number of victims.

In October 2019, during the 39-month planned transition to democracy, an official Khartoum massacre investigation commission was created as required under Article 7. (16) of the Sudanese August 2019 Draft Constitutional Declaration, under the authority of transition period Prime Minister Abdalla Hamdok. The commission is led by human rights lawyer Nabil Adib or Nabil Adib Abdalla and with no female members, to the objection of The No to Oppression against Women Initiative.

Background
Sudanese protests started in December 2018 after which the military removed Omar al-Bashir and established a Transitional Military Council which is headed by the Lieutenant-General Abdel Fattah Abdelrahman Burhan.

On 11 April 2019, the military removed al-Bashir from power in a coup d'état and created a Transitional Military Council (TMC). Following intense protests, Awad Ibn Auf announced his resignation and said that he had chosen Lieutenant-General Abdel Fattah Abdelrahman Burhan to lead the TMC. Protesters supported by the Sudanese Professionals Association (SPA) and democratic opposition groups engaged in street demonstrations, calling on the ruling Transitional Military Council to "immediately and unconditionally" step aside in favour of a civilian-led transitional government, and urging other reforms in Sudan. For about two months the TMC engaged the SPA in dialogue and discussion on how to shift to a transitional government, disagreeing over whether the transitional government should be civilian-led or military-led. And during the official discussions, there were many attempts on the TMC’s part to disperse protesters and clear the sit-in in front of the Military HQ in Khartoum.

On 30 May, the SPA expressed concern that a lethal attack by the TMC was intended, stating that on 29 May, "two citizens including a pregnant lady were shot dead by the TMC forces." The SPA warned that military trucks of NISS, the RSF, and other state security forces were accumulating around the area of the sit-in. On 1 June, the SPA said that it had reason to believe that the TMC was "planning and working to end the peaceful sit-in at the headquarters with excessive force and violence" after three people were killed in incidents on the fringes of the demonstration during the previous week.

Massacre
On 3 June 2019, the military armed forces of the TMC headed by the Rapid Support Forces, the succeeding front organization to the Janjaweed militia and NISS, together with other TMC forces used heavy gunfire and tear gas as well as sound bombs aiming at dispersing the sit-in killing more than 100 people with difficulties in estimating the actual number.

Estimating the number of victims was difficult in the days following the massacre because of Internet blockage and the deployment of brutal military forces across the capital. The Internet in Sudan was almost completely blocked during and following the massacre, a signature move of the TMC, on which the Janjaweed militias had a wide presence throughout Khartoum and prevented documenting the number of victims.

As of the evening of 4 June 2019, there were reports of a large number of victims in the field of the sit-in with difficulty evacuating them. There were several reports of bodies thrown into the Nile. Hundreds of unarmed civilians were injured, hundreds of unarmed citizens were arrested and many families were terrorised in their home estates across Sudan. Seventy women and men were raped by the RSF according to doctors in Khartoum hospitals.

On 9 June, witnesses reported the smell of rotten corpses coming from drainage channels and suspected that soldiers had thrown victims there.

In total, more than 200 military vehicles were used in the attack, with more than 10,000 soldiers and other unidentified personnel in police uniforms.

Timeline
The following is a timeline of what took place in the Khartoum sit-in camp:

 4:30 am: Janjaweed militias and NISS with other TMC forces started surveying the area of the sit-in camp in preparation for the attack.
 4:55 am: Around 100 military vehicles belonging to Janjaweed militias, armed with heavy military firearms, including anti-aircraft weapons and carrying hundreds of armed soldiers. These soldiers were carrying weapons and sticks when they surrounded the Military HQ in Khartoum. The cars prevented the unarmed civilians from entering the Military HQ. Simultaneously, another 100 white pick-up trucks without number plates, full of soldiers in police uniforms, arrived. Other Janjaweed soldiers were also seen in huge numbers along Nile Street.
 6:00 am - onward: The joint forces started the attack on the sit-in camp using live bullets, sound bombs and teargas, storming the civilians from all directions, leaving a narrow path for protesters to exit. The militia started burning the tents and shooting indiscriminately, leaving hundreds dead and injured and throwing many bodies into the Nile.

According to local resident and PhD student Mohammed Elnaiem, the first phase of the attack included discussion between RSF members and the regular army, and in the second phase, the army vehicles departed while RSF vehicles "drove through the barricades. Following the massacre, some bodies were recovered that wore uniforms belonging to the Sudanese Army. Activists concluded that there had been army soldiers who refused to attack the protestors or had attempted to protect them, whereupon they too had been murdered. Nahid Jabrallah attributed the murders to the RSF. After the main attack, the RSF shot wounded protestors in three Khartoum hospitals.

Sit-ins in Port Sudan, el-Gadarif and Sinja were also "raided and attacked by the RSF" on 3 June.

Mass rapes

France 24 documented evidence that the rapes of 70 women and men during the massacre were a deliberate campaign to "break the girls". Nahid Jabrallah, founder of the Sima Centre for Women and Children's Studies, and other activists and journalists, stated that there were extensive testimonies of gang rapes and other sexual violence by the RSF during the 3 June attacks. Huma, an activist, said that RSF soldiers humiliated women by asking them to remove their underwear. Online social network images showing women's underwear on a pole and a room full of women's clothing were considered "unverified" . Jabrallah stated that "everyone was threatened with being raped if they resisted the RSF's orders."

International criminal lawyer Celine Bardet of We are not Weapons of War said that evidence gathering for the systematic use of sexual violence as a tool of war needed separate consideration to other evidence gathering, because of social stigma against women testifying about the events. Bardet said that, evidence was being collected about "a fair amount of sexual violence" that might be used as evidence of an international crime, if the sexual violence were "systematic, targeted and [had] a specific objective". Activist Dalia El Roubi stated that "the symbolism behind the rape of women is very substantial, it's aimed at breaking society" and that the sexual violence of the 3 June massacre was a deliberate action by the RSF to "break" communities in a similar way to which communities were "broken" in Darfur.

Pramila Patten from the United Nations (UN) called for a UN human rights monitoring team to be sent to Sudan and for "rapes and gang rapes of protesters, women's rights defenders and women medical personnel working in hospitals near the sit-in" to stop.

Hala al-Karib, writing in Al Jazeera English, said that local activists provided systematic support for the rape victims, "[extending] their hands to the hundreds of male and female sexual violence survivors and the families of those who were killed" with "discipline and the commitment to support the survivors of violence". Al-Karib said that the activists "understood the root causes and politics behind sexual violence" and "approached sexual violence as a crime connected [to] power relations", while "not [undermining] how personal it is as a crime". Al-Karib criticised the lack of support from international "multimillion-dollar agencies and NGOs" with "fancy conference rooms to strategise in", stating that the "actors that are traditionally tasked with addressing sexual violence [remained] unable or unwilling to end Sudan's sexual violence epidemic and help its survivors achieve justice."

Victims
On 12 June 2019, the Sudanese Doctors' Syndicate published a list of 104 people that were killed on or after 3 June, including 12 children. The majority of the victims were killed by gunfire, while others were stabbed to death, burned, or had their skulls crushed after being run over by Janjaweed pick-up trucks. The list below includes the name of the victim (some unidentified), the date of death, age, hospital and cause of death as indicated by the Sudanese Doctors' Syndicate:

Responsibility

Transitional Military Council and Rapid Support Forces 
The military armed forces of the Transitional Military Council (TMC), headed by the Rapid Support Forces (RSF, derived from Janjaweed militias) led by Mohamed Hamdan Dagalo ("Hemedti"), the immediate successor organisation to the Janjaweed militia, are widely attributed as being responsible for the attack. The Daily Beast attributed responsibility directly to RSF under Hemedti's command, based on videos, testimonies by witnesses and interviews with civilian activists. Three separate enquiries released statements to the media in late July 2019. On 27 July, an Attorney-General enquiry requested by the TMC attributed responsibility to "at least eight high-ranking officers" and stated a death toll of 87 and no rapes. On 30 July, enquiries by the Darfur Bar Association and the National Umma Party attributed responsibility directly to the TMC, confirmed the occurrences of rapes as part of the event, and stated a total death toll of 124 (from 3 to 20 June).

Attorney-General enquiry

On 27 July, Fathelrahman Saeed, the head of a committee appointed by the Attorney-General at the request of the TMC to investigate the massacre, stated that 87 people had been killed, 168 injured, no rapes had occurred and no tents had been burnt. Saeed stated that legal cases for crimes against humanity had been launched against eight unnamed high-ranking security officers. The Sudan Forensic Doctors Union described the result of the enquiry as "poor and defective", and the FFC, the Sudanese Women's Union, the Sudanese Professionals Association and the Democratic Lawyers' Alliance rejected the report. Street protests took place in Khartoum in response to the report.

Darfur Bar Association enquiry

The Darfur Bar Association (DBA) created a Truth and Fact-finding Committee to investigate the massacre, primarily the incidents of rape. On 30 July, the DBA committee stated that eight rape victims were receiving psychological therapy; one in Omdurman had committed suicide as a result of the rape; one rape victim had been forced by social stigma to search for another home for her and her family. The DBA claimed that it had "ample evidence" of responsibility of TMC for the massacre and that the "decision to disband the sit-in" took place at a meeting including all TMC members, the Attorney-General, police chiefs and security directors. The DBA committee argued that the Attorney-General enquiry was neither professional, independent nor impartial.

 National Umma Party enquiry
The National Umma Party formed an enquiry committee led by Yousef El Amin. On 30 July, El Amin stated that the sit-in was disbanded by "a large military force wearing RSF uniforms and riot police" and that the massacre had been "premeditated and planned". He stated that 47 victims of the massacre died on 3 June, with a total of 124 dying from 3 to 20 June. He confirmed rapes, throwing of bodies into the Nile, and burning of tents.

International influences 
Iyad el-Baghdadi, a human rights activist who became famous during the Arab Spring, argued that the governments of Saudi Arabia, the United Arab Emirates (UAE) and Egypt supported the carrying out of the massacre. Some of the military vehicles and equipment used in the massacre were manufactured in the UAE. The late May visits by TMC leader al-Burhan to the Egyptian president el-Sisi and to the de facto ruler of the UAE, Mohammed bin Zayed Al Nahyan, and of the TMC deputy leader Dagalo to Mohammad bin Salman, the de facto ruler of Saudi Arabia, were interpreted by el-Baghdadi as encouragements for the TMC to cancel negotiations with the opposition and to carry out a massacre. El-Baghdadi situates this in the general context of Saudi, UAE and Egyptian leaders being afraid of democratic movements. Mahmoud Elmutasim, a political activist and doctor who graduated from the University of Khartoum, stated that Saudi Arabia and the UAE are opposed to the existence of democracies in the Middle East, since if "the idea of democracy itself [should] ever take root, or become widespread in the Middle East," then it would constitute a threat to the governmental systems of Saudi Arabia and the UAE.

The New Arab and Middle East Eye similarly argued that "The blooded assault was launched shortly after top Sudanese generals visited Riyadh, Abu Dhabi and Egypt to secure support for their takeover, with observers arguing the transitional military council received a green light from the three powerful Arab states for their move".

After news of the massacre, Egypt called for restraint and the UAE called for dialogue and an investigation into the massacre. Emirati Minister of Foreign Affairs Anwar Gargash stated "We are concerned about the massacre we've seen. We support calls for proper investigation". Gargash also called for dialogue which he hoped would prevail in Sudan, stating "The regional experience has taught us that the orderly and conservative transition of the state and its institutions is the only way to avoid years of chaos and loss".

Transition period official investigation

The Political Agreement between the TMC and the Forces for Freedom and Change (FFC) alliance for a Sudanese transition to democracy, which was initially agreed on verbally on 5 July 2019 and signed on 17 July, includes a plan for an independent Sudanese investigation into the 3 June Khartoum massacre "and related incidents of human rights violations committed against civilians or militaries".

According to an anonymous military official present at negotiations for the initial verbal deal, quoted by The Christian Science Monitor, US negotiators led by Donald E. Booth proposed that TMC members be guaranteed immunity from prosecution in the investigation. The military official stated, "The Americans demanded a deal as soon as possible. Their message was clear: power-sharing in return for guarantees that nobody from the council will be tried." In late July, the FFC requested that the constitutional declaration, a document intended to add details complementary to the political agreement, should give no immunity against prosecution to any civilian or military leaders of the transition institutions.

The Draft Constitutional Declaration signed in August 2019 confirmed the creation of an independent investigation, and gave "procedural" immunity to all senior members of the transition institutions, which can be removed by a simple majority vote of the Transitional Legislative Council. On 21 September 2019, the transition period prime minister, Abdalla Hamdok, issued a decision to initiate the official Khartoum massacre investigation with a 7-member committee of lawyers, independent from all other state bodies, to be assigned to carry out the investigation. The members of the men-only commission, headed by human rights lawyer Nabil Adib, were nominated on 20 October. The No to Oppression against Women Initiative objected to the absence of women members on the commission.

Other investigations
On 5 March 2020, an investigation by Physicians for Human Rights (PHR) stated that Sudanese security forces had planned the attack against pro-democracy stagings in Khartoum. The report said that the 3 June massacre was carried out using techniques by the Sudanese authorities in which they "purposefully pre-positioned" their units and armed them with tear gas and assault rifles before the attack was initiated. PHR stated, "Security forces' horrific tactics – sexual violence, including rape, use of tear gas, whips, batons, and live ammunition – killed and critically injured hundreds of civilians."

Aftermath 
On 4 June, Transitional Military Council (TMC) cancelled all agreements reached during talks with the main opposition alliance on setting up a transitional administration. The sides had agreed on forming a parliament and a government that would prepare for elections after three years. The leaders of the Declaration of Freedom and Change Forces (DFCF) opposition alliance, said an open-ended civil disobedience campaign would continue to try to force the council from power. The leaders also added that there is no room for negotiations," as military leaders attempted to do damage control in the face of international criticism of Monday's indiscriminate killings.

On 5 June, Khartoum was tense with many roads barricaded by protesters, shops shut and streets mostly empty. Rapid Support Forces (RSF) vehicles were patrolling the streets in Omdurman, on the other side of the River Nile from Khartoum and firing into the air.

On 5 June, the United Nations Security Council met on at the request of Britain and Germany to hear a briefing from UN envoy Nicholas Haysom, who has been working with the African Union (AU) on a solution to the crisis in Sudan. But China, backed by Russia, blocked a bid to condemn the killing of civilians and issue an urgent call from world powers for an immediate halt to the violence.
The DFCF called on all countries and international organisations to stop dealing with Sudan's Transitional Military Council. They also called on the international community to start looking into "the ongoing violations and crimes committed by (TMC) in all cities and towns and to stop it immediately." As reported by the Central Committee of Sudan Doctors (CCSD), an organisation of medical volunteers, dozens of bodies were pulled from the Nile Wednesday and doctors said they had been weighed down with rocks in an attempt to hide the true death toll.

On 6 June, the African Union Peace and Security Department issued a statement suspending the participation of Sudan in all AU activities with immediate effect - "until the effective establishment of a civilian-led transitional authority," which it described as the only way to "exit from the current crisis".

On 9 June, normally a regular working day in Sudan, protesters launched a civil disobedience campaign aiming at removing the TMC. Four people were shot dead by the TMC forces in Khartoum. As roads were blocked, almost all formal and informal businesses were closed, including, banks, public transport and Khartoum International Airport, where several airlines cancelled their Sudan flights following the massacre and passengers were left waiting outside airport's departures terminal. The general strike was followed by about 60–100% of workers, varying between sectors, for a total of 3 days and was followed on 12 June by an agreement between the TMC and the opposition to free political prisoners, stop the strike, and resume negotiations.

An online social media trend with the hashtag #BlueForSudan started several days after the massacre, representing solidarity for the protest movement, with blue signifying the favorite color of Mohamed Mattar, one of the victims of the massacre.

Two were killed on the second anniversary of the massacre, the killing took place in front of the military headquarter, the Sudanese military issued a statement calling it an "unfortunate event". Sudanese prime minister Abdallah Hamdok said he was shocked by the killings, calling it a "crime to use live bullets against peaceful protesters".

Reactions 
The United Nations Secretary-General, António Guterres, condemned the use of excessive force by Sudan's security agents and said he was "alarmed" by reports that forces had opened fire inside a hospital.

On 4 June, Norway, the United Kingdom, and the United States issued a statement on developments in Sudan. "The Troika condemns the violent attacks in Sudan on 3rd June, which resulted in the killing and injuring of many peaceful civilian protesters. By ordering these attacks, the Transitional Military Council has put the transition process and peace in Sudan in jeopardy. We call for an agreed transfer of power to a civilian-led government as demanded by the people of Sudan. We welcome the statement of the Chairperson of the African Union (AU) and support the important role of the AU in solving the crisis in Sudan, including its demand for an immediate handover to a civilian-led government". "The Troika also expresses its serious concern over the TMC’s announcement that it will cease negotiations with the Forces for Freedom and Change, retract all previous agreements with them on formation of an interim government, and will hold elections within nine months. The people of Sudan deserve an orderly transition, led by civilians, that can establish the conditions for free and fair elections, rather than have rushed elections imposed by the TMC’s security forces".

On 3 June, the African Union issued the following statement "The Chairperson of the African Union Commission, Moussa Faki strongly condemns the violence that erupted today which led to reported deaths and several civilian injuries. In this regard, he calls for an immediate and transparent investigation in order to hold those all responsible accountable. The Chairperson calls on the Transitional Military Council to protect the civilians from further harm". "the Chairperson calls on all international partners to reinforce common efforts towards the immediate cessation of the violence and rapid resumption of negotiations for a political settlement.

Works by artists and photographers
Many Sudanese artists designed and created pieces of art that show the scale of the massacre. Khalid Kodi from Boston College, United States, made a painting that depicts a Sudanese woman in front of the military headquarters, with the woman symbolising the women who were raped by the RSF during the massacre.

In 2021, the French book "Soudan. Année Zero" presented a detailed historical and sociological analysis of the weeks during the Sudanese revolution, that preceded the deadly assault and destruction of the site that protestors had occupied in front of the headquarters of the Armed Forces in central Khartoum. Part of this analysis of the Khartoum massacre are numerous pictures by Sudanese photographers who had documented the uprising until that point in time.

See also 
 2018–19 Sudanese protests
 2019 Sudanese coup d'état
 Transitional Military Council
 August 2013 Rabaa massacre

References 

2019 mass shootings in Africa
2019 murders in Sudan
Massacre

Crimes against humanity
June 2019 crimes in Africa
Massacres in 2019
Massacres in Sudan
Rape in Africa
Rape in the 2010s
Sudanese Revolution
Violence against women in Sudan